James French  (born 4 July 1953) is the former chairman and CEO of the airline Flybe. He owned approximately 7% of the overall business.

History 
French began his aviation career in 1970 with Caledonian Airways, before joining AirUK in 1980
French first joined Flybe in 1990, when it was known as Jersey European Airways; becoming commercial director shortly after. He subsequently became deputy Chief Executive and Chief Operating Officer. In 2001, French became chief executive of Flybe and became chairman in 2005.

French retired as CEO of Flybe in August 2013 and became non-executive chairman. Saad Hammad, formerly of EasyJet airline, became CEO and Simon Laffin became Chairman.

Awards 
French was appointed a CBE in 2009. and is a Deputy Lieutenant of Devon.

References 

1953 births
Living people
British chief executives
Commanders of the Order of the British Empire
Deputy Lieutenants of Devon